The Transgender Law and Policy Institute (TLPI) is a non-profit organization dedicated to engaging in effective advocacy for transgender people in the United States. The TLPI brings experts and advocates together to work on law and policy initiatives designed to advance transgender equality.

The Institute's web page has information on jurisdictions with transgender-inclusive non-discrimination laws, colleges and universities with non-discrimination policies that include gender identity and gender expression, and information on model laws and policies for schools, employers, and social workers.

See also
History of transgender people in the United States

References

External links
 Official Site 

Transgender organizations in the United States
Institutes based in the United States